Distribution resource planning (DRP) is a method used in business administration for planning orders within a supply chain. DRP enables the user to set certain inventory control parameters (like a safety stock) and calculate the time-phased inventory requirements. This process is also commonly referred to as distribution requirements planning.

DRP uses several variables:
the required quantity of product needed at the beginning of a period
the constrained quantity of product available at the beginning of a period
the recommended order quantity at the beginning of a period
the backordered demand at the end of a period
the on-hand inventory at the end of a period

DRP needs the following information:
the demand in a future period
the scheduled receipts at the beginning of a period
the on-hand inventory at the beginning of a period
the safety stock requirement for a period

See also
 Distribution (business)
 Document automation for supply chain and logistics
 Supply chain management

References
Feigin, G.E., Katircioglu, K., Yao, D.D.: Distribution Resource Planning systems: a critique and enhancement.

Supply chain management

pl:Planowanie zasobów dystrybucji